16th Avenue may refer to:

16th Avenue, a street forming the Music Row district of Nashville, Tennessee
"16th Avenue" (song), a 1982 song by Lacy J. Dalton
16 Avenue N, in Calgary, Alberta, Canada
16th Avenue (York Region), Ontario, Canada
16th Avenue Records, a defunct record label